Jairo Daniel Puerto Herrera (born December 28, 1988) is a Honduran football player who currently plays as a forward for NASL side Puerto Rico FC.

Club career
In early 2017, Puerto joined Liga Nacional de Fútbol side Honduras Progresso, but was only there long enough to play 5 games before joining Puerto Rico's Puerto Rico FC of the NASL, where he signed a two-year contract. He made his debut on 26 March 2017 against the New York Cosmos.

International career
Puerto was first called up to the Honduras senior side in 2015, for a friendly game against Cuba.

International goals
Scores and results list Honduras' goal tally first.

References

External links
 
 

Honduran footballers
Honduras international footballers
C.D. Honduras Progreso players
1988 births
Living people
Association football forwards
Puerto Rico FC players